Local Heroes is an American comedy television series created by Frank Mula. The series stars Ken Hudson Campbell, Kristin Dattilo, Louis Ferreira, Jason Kristofer and Jay Mohr. The series aired on Fox from March 17, 1996, to April 28, 1996.

Cast
Ken Hudson Campbell as Eddie Trakacs 
Kristin Dattilo as Bonnie 
Louis Ferreira as Mert 
Jason Kristofer as 'Stosh' Stoskolowski 
Jay Mohr as Jake Bartholomew
Theo Nicholas Pagones as Dimitri
Hope Allen as Elise Isadora
Paula Cale as Gloria
Tricia Vessey as Nikki

Episodes

References

External links
 

1990s American sitcoms
1996 American television series debuts
1996 American television series endings
English-language television shows
Fox Broadcasting Company original programming
Television shows set in Pittsburgh